WVBG (1490 kHz) is an AM radio station broadcasting a news/talk format. Licensed to Vicksburg, Mississippi, United States.  The station is currently owned by Owensville Communications, LLC.

References

External links

FCC History Cards for WVBG

VBG
News and talk radio stations in the United States
Radio stations established in 1948
1948 establishments in Mississippi